Waterhouse may refer to:

People
Waterhouse (surname)

Places
 Waterhouse, Tasmania, a locality in Australia
 Waterhouse Island (disambiguation)
 Waterhouse district of Kingston, Jamaica
 Waterhouse F.C., a football club based in the Waterhouse district of Kingston, Jamaica
 Waterhouse Museum in New Jersey

Other uses
 Waterhouse Company, a coachbuilder located in Webster, Massachusetts
 Waterhouse Natural History Art Prize, an annual prize awarded by the South Australian Museum

See also 
 Little Waterhouse Lake, Tasmania, Australia
 PricewaterhouseCoopers, an international professional services firm
 TD Waterhouse, a Canadian financial services corporation
 Waterhouse's swamp rat, a rodent species from South America
 Waterhouse's leaf-nosed bat, a species of bat from Central America
 Waterhouses (disambiguation)
 William H. Waterhouse House, a historic home in Maitland, Florida